The Brazilian automotive industry is coordinated by the Associação Nacional dos Fabricantes de Veículos Automotores (Anfavea), created in 1956, which includes automakers (cars, light vehicles, trucks, buses and agriculture machines) with factories in Brazil. Anfavea is part of the Organisation Internationale des Constructeurs d'Automobiles (OICA), based in Paris. In 2021, the annual production exceeded 2.2 million vehicles, the 8th largest in the world.

Most large global automotive companies are present in Brazil, such as: BMW, BYD, Chery, Ford, Geely, General Motors, Honda, Hyundai, JAC Motors, Kia, Land Rover, Lexus, Lifan, Mercedes-Benz, Mitsubishi, Nissan Motors, Renault, Stellantis, Subaru, Toyota, Volkswagen, Volvo Trucks, among others, and also the consecrated national companies such as Agrale, Marcopolo, Randon, Troller, and more. In the past there were national brands such as DKW Vemag, FNM and Gurgel. Some traditionally produced modern equipped replicas of older models.

Some companies such as Rolls-Royce and Porsche, rely on local distributors to import their vehicles, but brands with local factories, such as Honda and Chevrolet may also import some of their models.

History

The first Brazilian automotive industry was the work of Henry Ford, who started the Brazilian subsidiary of Ford Motor Company in 1919. In 1921 Ford opened its own production facility and was followed by General Motors in 1926. In 1928, Ford established the Fordlândia, an industrial district in the Amazon rainforest. The district is no longer in use but saw a populational growth compared to the early 2000s, when roughly 90 people lived in the town.

In 1956, the Romi-Isetta, an early Brazilian car, was initially produced, with license purchase of Italian Iso. In 1958, Toyota started to produce its famous Bandeirante. In 1959, the first Volkswagen factory was built, it started manufacturing the Type 2, which preceded the famous Beetle. At the same time, a Brazilian entrepreneur, Mr. Sebastiao William Cardoso, started producing an electrical small jeep called Tupi.

In the late 1950s, Chevrolet and Ford started manufacturing pickup trucks, and in the 1960s, automobiles and commercial vehicles, GM also brought buses. In 1967, Puma began selling sports cars. The Italian Fiat established its first factory in the 1970s, and Mercedes Benz started to produce trucks and buses during the 1950s, and opened an automobile factory in 1998. These companies dominated the Brazilian market until mid-1990s, when the Brazilian market was finally opened to imports. In the 1990s, more auto companies settled and opened factories in Brazil.

The automotive industry in Brazil sells to all over Latin America and the world. In the last few years, the Brazilian auto industry has grown quickly, attracting investments from the main global automakers. In 2007, production grew 14% compared to 2006 figures, reaching more than 4 million vehicles.

In October 2012, the Inovar-Auto Program was approved by decree with the theoretical goals of encouraging automakers to produce more fuel-efficient vehicles and investing in the national automotive industry, by managing taxation exceptions (IPI = Tax over Industrialized Product). However, the program has received criticism, especially of protectionism. The country has recently lost a WTO dispute against tax advantages and illegal practices of protectionism. The Inovar-Auto program ended in December 2017 and was replaced by the Route 2030 Program.

Timeline

1890s

1900s

1910s 
 1911: The first Brazilian automotive magazine, "Revista de Automóveis", was launched in Rio de Janeiro by the Automóvel Clube do Brasil, founded by Santos Dumont; the collection can be observed in the Automotive Press Museum (Miau), in São Paulo.
 1908-1913: The first trip by car from Rio de Janeiro to São Paulo was in 1908. The first trip by car from São Paulo to Curitiba was in 1913.
 1917: By now, the State of São Paulo had a fleet of 2,600 motor vehicles. In 1918, the first female driver in São Paulo, the wife of the commander of the Port of Santos, operated her automobile under protest from traditional families.
 1919: The first automotive industry of Brazil was implemented by Henry Ford. Model T and TT trucks began to be assembled in São Paulo.

1920s

1930s 
 1930: Ford was followed by concurrent General Motors with the assembly of the first Chevrolet cars in São Caetano do Sul, São Paulo, there until today, at Avenida Goiás.

1940s

1950s

1960s

1970s

1980s

1990s

2000s

2010s

2020s

Historical production by year

Historical sales

Motor Vehicle Manufacturers

Current

Large Passenger Vehicles Manufacturers and Importer 

 BMW Group
 BMW do Brasil
 Mini do Brasil
 Bugre
 BYD Brasil
 China South Industries Group
 Moto Traxx da Amazônia
  Effa Motors
  Fabral
 Mahindra
 SsangYong Brasil
 Ford do Brasil
 Fundação Romi
 Indústrias Romi
General Motors do Brasil
 Chevrolet do Brasil
  Great Wall Motors
  Grupo CAOA 
  CAOA (Former Ford dealer, Subaru and Renault importer, and currently manufacturing and importing Chery, Ford and Hyundai vehicles)
 CAOA Chery
Exeed
CAOA Subaru
Hyundai CAOA do Brasil
  Grupo CNH Industrial
 New Holland Agriculture
 New Holland Construction
Grupo Gandini
Kia Motors do Brasil
Grupo Volkswagen
  Volkswagen do Brasil
 Audi do Brasil (Former Audi Senna, an Audi AG subsidiary until 2005)
  Honda
  Honda Automóveis do Brasil
  HondaJet (Focused on aircraft engine)
  HPE Automotores do Brasil (Mitsubishi manufacturer)
  Hyundai Motor Brasil
  Iveco Group
  Iveco (The company was spun-off from CNH Industrial on 1 January 2022; in Brazil the separation occurred in 2019 when Iveco Group was formed)
 Iveco Bus
 FPT Industrial
  JAC Motors Brasil
  Jaguar e Land Rover Brasil
 Jaguar
 Land Rover
  Lifan do Brasil
  Mitsubishi Motors Brasil
  Nissan do Brasil Automóveis
  Renault do Brasil
  Stellantis – FCA
 Fiat Automóveis Brasil
 Jeep do Brasil
 RAM
  Stellantis – PSA
 Peugeot
 Citroën
  Suzuki Brasil
  Toyota do Brasil
 Lexus do Brasil
  UK Motors – Grupo Eurobike – Stuttgart Sportcar
 Aston Martin
 McLaren
 Porsche
  Valtra
  Via Itália
 Ferrari
 Lamborghini
 Maserati
 Rolls-Royce
  Volvo do Brasil
  Volvo Car of Brazil Automotive

Motorcycle and Bicycle manufacturers (Medium and Large Production) 
 Amazonas Motos Especiais (AME)
 Avelloz Motos
 Brasil & Movimento
 BMW do Brasil
 BMW Motorrad Brasil
  Bombardier Recreational Products (BRP)
 Bull Motors
 CFMoto-KTM
 CFMoto Brasil
 KTM Brasil
 Dafra Motos
 Dayang
 Ducati do Brasil
HaoJue Motos do Brasil
Harley-Davidson do Brasil
 Honda do Brasil
 Moto Honda da Amazônia
 Hot Custom Cycles
 HPE Automotores do Brasil (Suzuki representative)
 Iros Motos
 J Toledo Motos do Brasil
 Suzuki Motos do Brasil
Kawasaki do Brasil
Kymco Motos do Brasil
 Motocargo Industria e Comercio de Triciclo (Mtcar)
 Royal Enfield Brasil
  Shineray do Brasil
  Sousa Motos
  Triumph Brazil
  Vespa Brasil
  Voltz Motors do Brasil
  Yamaha Motor do Brasil

Bus, coach and truck manufacturers 
  Agrale
  Avibrás
  Caio Indústria e Comércio de Carrocerias (Caio Induscar)
 Carbuss Indústria Catarinense de Carrocerias (Formerly Busscar Ônibus)
  Comil Ônibus
 DAF Caminhões Brasil
 Foton Caminhões
  Fábrica Nacional de Mobilidade (FNM) (Focused in electric semi trucks; not to be confused with Fábrica Nacional de Motores (FNM))
  Marcopolo S.A.
 Neobus
  Mercedes-Benz do Brasil
  Mascarello Carrocerias e Ônibus
  Volvo do Brasil
  Volvo Caminhões Brasil
  Volvo Ônibus Brasil
Volkswagen do Brasil
Traton SE (Formerly MAN SE)
 Volkswagen Caminhões e Ônibus (Some models are rebadged Man trucks)
 Scania Brasil

Tractors manufacturers

  AGCO
  Caterpillar Brasil
  Fundação Romi
  Máquinas Agrícolas Romi (Agricultural machinery division)
  Grupo CNH Industrial
 CASE Construction
  John Deere Brasil 
  Komatsu 
  Massey Ferguson
  Valtra

A link to a map containing all plants currently in Brazil:

Current and Former Independent, Custom and Foreign Manufacturers 
 Agrale (Motorcycle division)
 Alfa Romeo
 Athena Auto (Partnership between Fibracar Compósitos and Scherer Automotiva)
 Athos Cars (Formerly Chamonix Athos)
 AutoLatina
 Automotiva Usiminas (Formerly Brasinca; manufactured car body, dump container and crew-cabs for companies such as Ford, Mercedes-Benz, Toyota, Simca, Scania, Massey Ferguson, Volkswagen, Volvo, Chevrolet and FNM, between 1950s and mid-1990s)
 Benelli
 Bernardini
 CBP Indústria, Comércio e Exportação (Closed due to trademark infringement; bought Coyote Indústria e Comércio, a former autocross vehicle manufacturer, in the late 80s)
 Chrysler (Ceased sales; representation, concessionaires and repair shop still operational)
 Chrysler
 Dodge
 Companhia Brasileira de Tratores (CBT) (Declared bankruptcy)
 Companhia Distribuidora Geral Brasmotor (Former manufacturer for Chrysler, Plymouth, Fargo and Volkswagen; currently owned by Whirlpool, produces since only refrigerators)
 Companhia Industrial Santa Matilde
 Companhia de Intercâmbio Pan-Americano (CIPAN) (Chrysler, Plymouth and Fargo representative)
 Distribuidora de Automóveis, Caminhões e Ônibus Nacionais (Dacon) (Volkswagen and Porsche representative)
 Projets d'AvantGarde (PAG DACON)
 Emis Indústria e Comércio de Veículos
 Engenheiros Especializados (Engesa)
 Farus Indústria de Veículos Esportivos
 Ford Motors Company Brasil
 Ford do Brasil (Ceased production in 2021; focused in importing premium models)
 Troller
 Fábrica Nacional de Motores (Reestablished as Fábrica Nacional de Mobilidade, focused in Electric trucks)
 Grupo Busscar (Declared bankruptcy)
 Busscar Ônibus (Reopened as Carbuss Indústria Catarinense de Carrocerias)
Grupo Souza Ramos
 Ford Souza Ramos (Biggest Ford representative; defunct after Ford do Brasil ceased production)
 SR Veículos Especiais
 MMC Automotores do Brasil (Mitsubishi representative and manufacturer) 
 Gurgel Indústria e Comércio de Veículos (Formerly Moplast Moldagem de Plástico)
 Hofstetter Indústria e Comércio de Veículos
 Indústria Brasileira de Automóveis Presidente (IBAP)
 Indústria Brasileira de Veículos (IBV)
 Indústria de Carrocerias Bugre
 JPX Indústria e Comércio (Founded by Eike Batista)
 Karmann-Ghia do Brasil (Subsidiary of Wilhelm Karmann)
 Kasinski (Currently under Magneti Marelli brand, a Fiat subsidiary)
 Cofap – Companhia Fabricadora de Peças
 Cofave – Sociedade Amazonense Fabricadora de Veículos
Kers Tecnologia em Mobilidade Sustentável (Microenterprise supported by Unioeste University and the government of the State of Parana)
 LHM Indústria Mecânica (Formerly Nurburgring Indústria e Comércio)
 Lafer (Ceased auto vehicle industry; still producing furniture)
 Little Croc (Amphibious buggy)
 Lobby Indústria e Comércio (Formerly Matis Indústria e Comércio)
 L’Auto Craft Montadora de Veículos (Formerly L’Automobile Distribuidora de Veículos)
 Mahindra & Mahindra (Ceased passenger vehicles production in 2015, still produce tractors)
 Material Ferroviário (Mostly known as Mafersa)
 Mercedes-Benz (Ceased passenger vehicles production in 2020, still produce truck and bus)
 Miura (Currently owned by Rangel & Lima Indústria de Veículos; Formerly owned by Besson, Gobbi & Cia.)
 Mobilis (Startup focused in urban mobility solution; produced a small electric vehicle in 2017)
 Montauto – Montadora Nacional de Automóveis / BRM – Buggy Rodas e Motores (Biggest dune buggy manufacturer in Brazil)
 Mundeo (Propeller-driven car built "to simulate the feel of an inverted flight"; traffic restriction on public roads)
Nasser Brasil Motores Indústria e Comércio de Veículos (NBM)
 NBM Indústria, Comércio de Veículos
 Obvio! Automotoveículos
 Vrooom! Veículos Elétricos (Currently active and focused on electric vehicles)
 Pioneira da Indústria Nacional de Automóveis Reunida (Pinar)
 Plascar – (Formerly Oscar S.A. Indústria de Artefatos de Borracha)
 Polaris
 Indian Motorcycle
Puma Automóveis
 Py Motors Comércio e Indústria
 SEED (Acronym for: Small Electric with Economic Design) (Formerly MMR Motorsport)
 Simca do Brasil (Replaced by Chrysler do Brasil in 1967)
 TAC (Formerly Tecnologia Automotiva Catarinense (TAC); utility car project sold to the Chinese Zotye)
 Tarso Marques Concept (TMC) (Founded by Tarso Marques, former Formula 1 pilot; specialized in custom jobs)
 Vemag-DKW (Vemag was acquired by Volkswagen do Brasil in 1967)
 Viação Cometa (Currently owned by Auto Viação 1001)
 Companhia Manufatureira Auxiliar (CMA)
 Viação Itapemirim
 Tecnobus – Serviços, Comércio e Indústria (Formerly Tecnobus Implementos Rodoviários)
VLEGA Gaucho
 Willys-Overland do Brasil
 Wladimir Martins Veículos (WMV) (Sold to Polystilo Indústria e Comércio in 1983 and for Py Motors in 1986)

Educational Institutions 
 Escola de Engenharia de São Carlos (EESC-USP)
 Faculdade de Engenharia Industrial (FEI)
 Instituto Mauá de Tecnologia

Local manufacture encouraged
As of 2022, Brazil has a 16~18% tariff on imported combustion engine vehicles and 0% on electric vehicles.

Passenger Vehicle Currently Offered and Manufactured in Large Scale

Agrale: Marruá

Audi: Q3, Q3 Sportback; Imported: A3, A4, A5, A6, A8, Q5, Q7, Q8, RS, e-tron and e-tron GT

BMW: 3 Series, X1, X3, X4; Imported: 1 Series, 2 Series, 4 Series, 5 Series, 7 Series, X2, X5, X6, X7, Z4, iX and i3 (until July 2022)

CAOA Chery: Tiggo 5x Pro, Tiggo 7 Pro, Tiggo 8; Imported: iCar, Arrizo 6 Pro, Tiggo 8 Pro Plug-in Hybrid

Chevrolet: Onix, Onix Plus, Montana, Spin, Tracker, S10, Trailblazer; Imported: Cruze and Equinox; Exported: Joy (until early 2023), Joy Plus (until early 2023)

Citroën: C3, C4 Cactus; Imported: Jumpy, e-Jumpy, Jumper

Fiat: Argo, Mobi, Pulse, Abarth Pulse, Strada, Toro, Fiorino, Fastback; Imported: Cronos, 500e, Scudo, e-Scudo, Ducato

Honda: City (Sedan and Hatchback), HR-V; Imported:  Civic e:HEV (sedan),: Accord; Exported: WR-V

Hyundai: Creta, HB20, HB20S, Tucson

Jeep: Commander, Compass, Renegade

Land Rover: Land Rover Discovery, Range Rover Evoque; Imported: Defender, Velar

MINI: Clubman, Countryman; Imported: Cabrio

Mitsubishi: L200 Triton, Eclipse Cross; Imported: Pajero

Nissan: Kicks; Imported: Frontier, Leaf, Versa

Peugeot: 2008, Partner Rapid; Imported: 208, e-208, e-2008, 3008, Expert, e-Expert, Boxer

Renault: Captur, Duster, Oroch, Logan, Kwid, Sandero, Master; Imported: Kwid E-Tech, Zoe, Kangoo

Toyota: Corolla, Corolla Cross, Yaris (Sedan and Hatchback); Imported: Hilux, SW4, RAV4; Export: Etios

Volkswagen: Nivus, Polo, Saveiro, T-Cross, Virtus; Imported: Amarok, Jetta, Taos

See also
 Brazilian Highway System
 Ethanol fuel in Brazil
 FENABRAVE
 Infrastructure of Brazil
 List of automobiles manufactured in Brazil
 List of exports of Brazil
 Transport in Brazil

References

External links
 Anfavea Statistical Yearbook of 1997

Articles needing cleanup from February 2022
Cleanup tagged articles with a reason field from February 2022
Wikipedia pages needing cleanup from February 2022
Automotive industry in Brazil
Industry in Brazil